Saied is both a given name and a surname. Notable people with the name include:

Saied Reza Ameli (born 1961), Iranian academic
Feras Saied (1981–2015), Syrian bodybuilder
Yamani Saied (born 1978), Panamanian model and beauty pageant winner
Kais Saied (born 1958), Tunis president
Samir Saïed (born 1957), Tunisian businessman and cabinet minister

Fictional characters
Saied, a character better known as Manticore, member of the Onslaught from DC Comics.

See also
Sa‘id